Valtellina Casera is a cheese made from semi-skimmed cows' milk in the northern Italian province of Sondrio. Its origins date back to the sixteenth century and it is much used in the cuisine of the Valtellina: particularly in dishes based on buckwheat flour such as pizzoccheri and sciatt (toad(s) in Lombard language).

It has had Protected designation of origin (PDO) status under European Union law since 1996; its production is managed by the Consorzio Tutela Formaggi Valtellina Casera e Bitto and certification is regulated by CSQA of Thiene.

References

External links
 Consorzio Tutela Formaggi Valtellina Casera e Bitto

Cow's-milk cheeses
Italian products with protected designation of origin
Cheeses with designation of origin protected in the European Union
Lombard cheeses